Michael Gwyl Bevan (born 8 May 1970) is a former Australian cricketer. He is a left-handed batsman and a slow left arm wrist-spin bowler. He has been credited for initiating the art of finishing matches. For several years, he was considered as world's finest ever ODI batsman as he often topped the ICC ODI batting rankings on numerous occasions. He was the first Canberra-born player to represent Australia at international level. He was known for his ability to run between the wickets at a quick rate and for his ability to play shots down the ground with ease.

He was an Australian Cricket Academy scholarship holder in 1989. He played 232 One Day Internationals (ODIs) for Australia, and was a part of the 1999 and 2003 teams that won the Cricket World Cup. He represented Australia at the 1998 Commonwealth Games, where cricket was included in the Commonwealth Games for the first time.

He has amassed 15103 runs in List A cricket at an average of 57.86 which is the highest average by any player to have scored 10,000 runs in List A cricket. He was named as a batsman in Australia's "greatest ever ODI team."

Playing career

Domestic career
Michael Bevan's first senior club was Weston Creek Cricket Club in Canberra. He made his first-class debut in 1989-90 domestic season for New South Wales and scored a century on his first-class debut in the first innings of the match.

Although Bevan played most of his domestic career for the New South Wales Blues, he moved to the Tasmanian Tigers for the 2004–05 season, where he continued his successes up until his retirement in January 2007. He also played for South Australia and in England for Yorkshire, Leicestershire and Sussex. In the 2004/05 Sheffield Shield season, he scored a then-record 1464 runs in the season for Tasmania. Despite this form, he missed Australian selection.

ODI career

He made his ODI debut on 14 April 1994 against Sri Lanka in the 1994 Austral-Asia Cup atv Sharjah and was not required to bat as Australia chased down 155 comfortably with nine wickets to spare. By the 1995–96 season, he became a regular in the side. He proved a reliable anchor at the bottom of the middle order, and he would often patiently guide Australia to victory following a rare top-order collapse – leading to him being nicknamed "The Finisher". By the end of his ODI career, Bevan was known as the "Pyjama Picasso". During his ODI career, he managed to hit just 21 sixes in 232 ODI matches. He batted 45 times in successful ODI run chases for Australia and out of those 45 outings, he remained unbeaten at the crease on 25 occasions when Australia won.

One of his most famous "anchor" innings was in the New Year's Day One Day International at the Sydney Cricket Ground against the West Indies in 1996 during the Benson & Hedges World Series. With the Australians at one stage 6/38 chasing 173, his unbeaten 150-minute 78 got the Australians over the line with a four on the last ball of the innings. He was the second leading run scorer in the 1995/96 Benson & Hedges World Series only behind Mark Taylor with an aggregate of 389 runs in 10 innings at an impressive mind boggling average of 194.5, bolstered by eight not-outs out of the 10 innings striking at 83.65 throughout the tournament.

He featured in his first World Cup tournament during the 1996 Cricket World Cup and played a crucial role to help Australia to reach the final of the tournament by scoring 69 runs in the semi-final clash against the West Indies, a match which is highly remembered and known due to the dramatic collapse of the West Indies in a low scoring run chase of 208. He also played an important cameo of unbeaten 36 off 49 balls in the 1996 World Cup final which propelled Australia to a decent total of 241/7 on the board. However, his efforts went in vain as Sri Lanka chased down 242 to win their maiden World Cup title.

He was selected to the Australian squad for the 50 over cricket tournament at the 1998 Commonwealth Games where Australia became runners-up in the competition to South Africa. He was a key member of the Australian side which lifted the 1999 Cricket World Cup.

On 8 April 2000, he played arguably the best knock of his career where he steered the mammoth epic run chase of 321 by scoring an unbeaten 185 off just 132 deliveries in an unofficial ODI held in Dhaka which almost guaranteed Rest of the World XI for an unlikely victory against the Asia XI. Rest of the World XI at one stage were reeling at 1967 in the 37th over and was staring at a big defeat before Bevan came to the rescue who smashed 19 fours and five sixes to provide a glimmer of hope. He alongside Andy Caddick put on a 119 run partnership for the eighth wicket which led to a great recovery for the chasing side. However, Rest of the World XI lost by just one run in the end despite the heroics of Bevan. Caddick was involved in a brainfade moment in the critical juncture of the match as he was run out on the penultimate delivery effectively denying Rest of the World XI a famous win given the circumstances on how the game had panned out. However, his knock of 185 not out could not be realised as Bevan's highest ODI or even List A score due to the fact that the match did not have any status as it was deemed as an unofficial ODI meaning the match does not even count as a List A match.

In January 2002, he scored a crucial unbeaten 95 ball 102 in a match against New Zealand in a modest run chase of 246 at the iconic Melbourne Cricket Ground. He arrived to the crease as he once again had to do the bulk of scoring runs after all familiar Aussie top-order collapse as Australia were reeling at 82/6 at one point to then reduced to 143/7. His knock guaranteed Australia a thrilling two wicket win over New Zealand with three balls to spare.

Bevan entered the 2003 Cricket World Cup injured. He played his first game in the group stage against India. He didn't bat until the fifth group game against Namibia and he registered a rusty 17 before being caught and bowled by Louis Burger. In the final group game against England, he came in with Australia struggling at 48–4. He then was joined by Andy Bichel at 135–8 with 70 runs still required to win. Bevan finished on 74 not out and Bichel 34 not out as Australia won in the final over. An unbeaten group stage was followed by an unbeaten Super Six stage. He made 56 against New Zealand helping Australia recover from 84–7 again batting with Bichel to help Australia win. His last knock was an unfortunate golden duck in the semi-final against Sri Lanka and he was not required to bat in the final which Australia won.

Test career

Despite his ODI success, Bevan's Test career was not nearly as successful. Thought to be susceptible to short-pitched deliveries, he had limited success as a Test batsman, with an average of only 29. He ended up his topsy-turvy test career without a career century to his name. However he scored heavily in domestic first-class cricket for New South Wales, averaging almost 60 with the bat. He performed well during his limited time as a bowler in Test matches, with his bowling style of left-arm unorthodox spin, which included taking ten wickets in a test match against the West Indies at the Adelaide Oval.

The retirement of Allan Border opened doors for his arrival to international cricket. He made his test debut against Pakistan on 28 September 1994 as the 360th test cap for Australia. He had a promising start to his test career scoring 82 batting at no 5 on his debut in Australia's first innings and just fell short of 18 runs which would have brought him in an elite list of test centurions on debut. He continued his momentum in his debut test series which was against Pakistan by making two more half-centuries. During the test series against the West Indies in 1997-98, he showed his all-round prowess both with the bat and ball scoring two unbeaten 80s when batting down the order and often ran out of partners during the course of those knocks while also picking up 15 wickets.

He admitted that the reason why his test career never really took off is mainly due to the psychological reasons and not the technical reasons.

Retirement
On 17 January 2007, due to injuries Bevan announced his retirement from all forms of cricket. "It got to the stage where injuries and pain were holding back my motivation, and it got to the stage where I was finding it hard to get up for matches and that was probably a pretty clear indication that it was time to move on," Bevan said.

Post-playing career

Coaching
Apart from coaching the Chennai Superstars in the Indian Cricket League, Bevan participated in the Beach Cricket Tri-Nations series for Australia. In January 2011, Bevan was announced the coach for Indian Premier League team Kings XI Punjab.

Television
In 2020, Bevan was revealed to be the 'Hammerhead' in the second season of The Masked Singer Australia and was the second contestant eliminated, placing 11th overall.

References

External links

1970 births
Living people
Australia One Day International cricketers
Australia Test cricketers
Kent cricketers
Leicestershire cricketers
New South Wales cricketers
People from the Australian Capital Territory
South Australia cricketers
Sussex cricketers
Tasmania cricketers
Yorkshire cricketers
Cricketers at the 1996 Cricket World Cup
Cricketers at the 1999 Cricket World Cup
Cricketers at the 2003 Cricket World Cup
Cricketers at the 1998 Commonwealth Games
Commonwealth Games silver medallists for Australia
Australian cricket coaches
Indian Premier League coaches
Indian Cricket League coaches
Australian cricketers
Australian Institute of Sport cricketers
Cricketers from the Australian Capital Territory
Sportspeople from Canberra
Commonwealth Games medallists in cricket
ACT Academy of Sport alumni
Medallists at the 1998 Commonwealth Games